Alba Adriatica-Nereto-Controguerra is a railway station serving the towns of Alba Adriatica, Nereto and Controguerra in the region of Abruzzo, Italy. The station is located on the Adriatic railway and the train services are operated by Trenitalia and Ferrovia Adriatico Sangritana.

Train services
The station is served by the following service(s):

Express services (Regionale Veloce) Milan - Bologna - Rimini - Ancona - Pescara (weekends only)
Regional services (Treno regionale) Rimini - Pesaro - Ancona - Civitanova Marche - San Benedetto del Tronto - Pescara
Local services (Treno regionale) San Benedetto del Tronto - Pescara - Lanciano

References

 This article is based upon a translation of the Italian language version as at January 2015.

Railway stations in Abruzzo
Buildings and structures in the Province of Teramo